The Sandman is a 2000 dance film made by the Brothers Quay and William Tuckett. A televised ballet, it stars Tamara Rojo, Irek Mukhamedov, Zenaida Yanowsky, and Heathcote Williams. It is loosely based on E. T. A. Hoffmann's story "The Sandman".

References

External links
 

2000 films
Ballet films
Films based on The Sandman (short story)
Films directed by the Brothers Quay
British dance films
2000s English-language films
British television films
2000s British films